Yala (Iyala) is an Idomoid language of Ogoja, Nigeria. Blench (2019) lists dialects as Ikom, Obubra, and Ogoja.

References

Idomoid languages